Georgia State Route 24 Connector may refer to:

 Georgia State Route 24 Connector (Commerce): a former connector route of State Route 24 that existed entirely within the city limits of Commerce
 Georgia State Route 24 Connector (Milledgeville): a former connector route of State Route 24 that existed entirely within the city limits of Milledgeville

024 Connector